Adrienne Alease Jones (born November 20, 1954) is the Speaker of the Maryland House of Delegates, the first African-American and first woman to serve in that position in Maryland. Initially appointed by Governor Parris Glendening to fill the vacancy created by the death of Delegate Joan Neverdonn Parker in 1997, she won multiple subsequent elections to the House. In a special session on May 1, 2019, Jones emerged as the compromise candidate to become Speaker after an earlier vote resulted in a split decision between Delegates Maggie McIntosh and Dereck Davis.

Early life, education and early career 
Born in Cowdensville, Maryland, a historic African-American community located near Arbutus, in Southwest Baltimore County. Jones attended Baltimore County public schools and graduated from Lansdowne High School.  She graduated from the University of Maryland, Baltimore County with a Bachelor of Arts in psychology in 1976. She has served as the Director of the Office of Minority Affairs in Baltimore County (1989–95) and is the Executive Director of the Office of Fair Practices and Community Affairs in Baltimore County.

Legislative career 
Jones has been a member of House of Delegates since October 21, 1997, representing District 10. In addition to being Speaker Pro Tempore from 2003 to 2019, she was a member of the House Appropriations Committee and its public safety & administration subcommittee, among others. She also provides leadership through the Legislative Policy, Spending Affordability, Rules and Executive Nominations and Legislative Ethics Committees. She is also a member of the Legislative Black Caucus of Maryland.

Legislative notes 
 Voted for Healthy Air Act in 2006 (SB154)
 Voted against slot machines in 2005 (HB1361)
 Voted for income tax reduction in 1998 (SB750)
 Voted in favor of Tax Reform Act of 2007 (HB2)

Election as Speaker 

Jones took over as Acting Speaker of the Maryland House of Delegates on April 7, 2019, following the death of then-Speaker Michael Busch. On May 1, the House of Delegates unanimously elected Jones as Speaker of the House by a vote of 139–0, after Delegates Maggie McIntosh (D-Baltimore City) and Dereck Davis (D-Prince George's County) bowed out of the Speaker's race in favor of Jones. Jones is both the first female and first African-American speaker in Maryland state history.

In April 2022 Jones signed 103 Maryland measures into law together with Republican Governor Larry Hogan and President pro tem Melony G. Griffith. It was the first time that two black women had taken part in such a ceremony as Maryland's presiding officers. Jones represented the house while Griffiths as the President pro tem represented the Maryland Senate.

2006 general election results, District 10 
Voters to choose three:
{| class="wikitable"
|-
!Name
!Votes
!Percent
!Outcome
|-
|-
|Emmett C. Burns, Jr.
|29,140
|  34.2%
|   Won
|-
|-
|Shirley Nathan-Pulliam
|28,544
|  33.5%
|   Won
|-
|-
|Adrienne A. Jones 
|27,064
|  31.8%
|   Won
|-
|Other Write-Ins
|370
|  0.4%
|   
|-
|}

Notes 

|-

1954 births
21st-century American politicians
21st-century American women politicians
African-American state legislators in Maryland
African-American women in politics
Living people
People from Woodstock, Maryland
Women state legislators in Maryland
Speakers of the Maryland House of Delegates
Democratic Party members of the Maryland House of Delegates
21st-century African-American women
21st-century African-American politicians
20th-century African-American people
20th-century African-American women